The Oxcentrics is a Dixieland jazz band founded in 1975 at Oxford University. The band's name was derived from The Oxontrics, an original 1920s jazz band. Several (although by no means all) members were from University College, where many of the rehearsals took place. They played at a number of Oxford Balls, for the Oxford University Jazz Club, on May Morning, and for other events, including playing on punts on the River Cherwell in Oxford.  The line-up, mostly Oxford University undergraduates, who recorded The Halcyon Days of the '20s & '30s on 29 February 1976 at the Acorn Studios in Stonesfield, Oxfordshire, and the songs recorded were:<ref>{{citation| title=The Halcyon Days of the '20s & '30s | date=29 February 1976 | publisher=Acorn Studios | location=Stonesfield, UK }}</ref>

Musicians
 Adrian Sheen — vocals
 Geoff 'Hot-Lips' Varrall — trumpet
 Adam Brett — trumpet
 Olly Weindling — clarinet
 Glyn Lewis — tenor saxophone
 Paul St John-Smith — trombone
 Charles 'Herbie' Kuta — tuba
 Simon 'Des' Wallace — piano
 Graham Downing — banjo
 Chris West — drums

Titles
 Russian Rag Tiger Rag Don't Bring Lulu Dixieland Clarinet Marmalade High Society Petite Fleur At the Jazz Band Ball Sweet Georgia BrownAdrian Sheen was the original bandleader and Mike Southon subsequently took over as frontman in late 1976 (as "Gorgeous Mike Vaseline"). Colin Moynihan was the original but short-lived pianist. Sally Jones tap danced for the band on occasions. Jonathan Bowen took many photographs and recorded the band in the 1970s. Further musicians who played with the Oxcentrics included Yva Thakurdas (trumpet) and Hugh Wallis (tuba). The band's manager was Laura Lassman.

The band continued in a changed form in London in the 1980s, managed by Olly Weindling, using many of the top young London jazz musicians such as Ashley Slater, Mark Lockheart and Billy Jenkins. Guests included Django Bates, Iain Ballamy and many others from Loose Tubes. In 1988, the Oxcentrics produced a CD, Oxcentromania! through Eccentric Records.

In 2005, the Oxcentrics reformed to celebrate their 30th anniversary. They also got together again in 2006 for a one-off gig at a ball held at St Hugh's College, Oxford, again in 2016 for a late 40th-anniversary gig, and in 2019 back at University College, Oxford, followed by a recording session. In 2020, during the COVID-19 pandemic, the band produced a distributed lockdown version of the 1925 song Don't Bring Lulu''.

See also
 Dixieland
 Jazz
 Trad jazz

References

External links

 The Oxcentrics on Archive.org
 Oxcentrics on MySpace
 Oxcentrics Top # 6 Facts on YouTube
 

1975 establishments in England
Musical groups established in 1975
Musical groups from Oxford
English jazz ensembles
Dixieland revival ensembles
Culture of the University of Oxford
History of the University of Oxford
Lists of people associated with the University of Oxford
University College, Oxford